Leonardo Vial Terçariol (born 14 April 1987) is a Brazilian handball player for BM Benidorm and the Brazilian national team.

He represented Brazil at the 2019 World Men's Handball Championship. He competed at the 2020 Summer Olympics.

Individual awards
2020 South and Central American Men's Handball Championship: Best goalkeeper

References

External links

1987 births
Living people
Brazilian male handball players
Liga ASOBAL players
Expatriate handball players
Brazilian expatriate sportspeople in Spain
Pan American Games medalists in handball
Pan American Games bronze medalists for Brazil
Handball players at the 2019 Pan American Games
Medalists at the 2019 Pan American Games
Handball players at the 2020 Summer Olympics
People from São Bernardo do Campo
Sportspeople from São Paulo (state)
21st-century Brazilian people